The original World Trade Center, which featured the landmark Twin Towers (1 WTC and 2 WTC), was a building complex in the Financial District in Lower Manhattan, New York City. 1 and 2 World Trade Center – the North and South Tower – stood at 417 meters and 415 meters (1,368 feet and 1,362 feet) with 110-stories respectively, becoming the tallest buildings in the world from 1971 to 1973. The North Tower, with its antenna included, was the tallest building in the world by pinnacle height until the towers were destroyed in the September 11 attacks in 2001. An iconic feature of the New York City skyline for nearly three decades, the World Trade Center has been featured in cartoons, comic books, computer games, video games, television, films, photographs, artwork, and music videos.

Literature

Books
In Richard Martin Stern's novel The Tower (1973), a breeches buoy line shot from a helicopter is used to link the World Trade Center's North Tower to the neighboring (fictional and taller) "World Tower Building," in order to rescue of hundreds of people trapped by a fire. Dozens of people are saved by this method, before the breeches buoy is overwhelmed in a panic, and crashes to the ground below. The World Trade Center's Twin Towers appear on the cover of Wilt Chamberlain's 1991 reissue of his book A View From Above. Similarly, The World Trade Center can be seen on the cover of Anne Gutman and Georg Hallensleben's children's book Lisa in New York (The Misadventures of Gaspard and Lisa), which was published in 2002, a year after the building complex was destroyed. and in Godzilla: Monster Apocalypse, the prequel novel of Godzilla: Planet of the Monsters anime film, the giant mantis Kamacuras appeared in New York City in May 1999, and proceeded to destroy the World Trade Center and devastate much of the city, leaving 2.5 million casualties.

The Towers also appeared on the paperback cover of Bright Lights, Big City, Jay McInerney's iconic novel of 1980s New York. The book was published in September 1984 as the first original title from the newly created Vintage Contemporaries imprint.

Philippe Petit's tightrope walk in 1974 between the two towers is fictionalized in Colum McCann's novel of 1970s New York, Let the Great World Spin. The fall of the towers forms part of the plot of Ken Kalfus' novel A Disorder Peculiar to the Country, and the attack also appears on its paperback cover.

Comic books and graphic novels
Most of the Marvel Comics' heroes reside in New York City, so views of the towers were not uncommon. The World Trade Center complex was featured in numerous other comics as well.
 In 1985 The Uncanny X-Men #189 continued the alternate vision of the future first seen in the Days of Future Past story line. Rachel Summers (who came from the future), while describing the dire future of the early 21st century, says "The Twin Towers of World Trade Center lie in ruins. Thousands are dead, many more injured". The accompanying image is of a somewhat futuristic Twin Towers smoldering after having been hit by an unknown attack.
 The 1986 graphic novel Rebel, by Pepe Moreno, depicted the two towers being destroyed in a post-apocalyptic 2002 setting.
 In the 1989 Damage Control, the Twin Towers were damaged when a giant robot fell on them. Damage Control, a construction company that specialized in repairing superhero-related damage, had the towers repaired (although visibly crooked) by the end of the issue.
 In the 1992 Mort & Phil comic El 35 aniversario (The 35th Anniversary) appears an image of a plane that crashes into the WTC.
 Adventures of Superman #596 was coincidentally released one day after the September 11, 2001 attacks. It depicted, in passing, the World Trade Center (specifically the Twin Towers) as having been damaged but not destroyed by an alien attack (along with other world landmarks such as the White House, the Eiffel Tower, the Sydney Opera House, the Great Wall of China, Big Ben, and the in-universe LexCorp Building).  The issue's artist, Mike Wieringo, remarked, "The book was completed months ago. The ironic thing is that the damage done by the terrorists is far greater than I could ever portray visually." The book's writer, Joe Casey, could not have intentionally referenced the attacks on the World Trade Center, but DC acknowledged that it mirrored the devastation so vividly that they made the books returnable without penalty to retailers. Many retailers took DC up on this offer, causing the issue to become sought after on the secondary market due to its rarity and general curiosity towards the real-life synchronicity with the 9-11 attacks.
 Captain America vol. 4 #1 had Steve Rogers arguing with Nick Fury when the former decided to stay and find survivors before heading to Afghanistan.
 Marvel Comics' Marvel Graphic Novel #17 depicts the Living Monolith standing almost as tall as the World Trade Center and thrusting his giant fist through one of the towers.
 The 2004 comic Ex Machina detailed the life of Mitchell Hundred, formerly the world's first and only superhero, who was elected mayor of New York City in the wake of his saving hundreds of lives during the North Tower's collapse, and in preventing the South Tower's collapse.
 The Amazing Spider-Man vol. 2 #36 showed the aftermath of the Towers’ collapse through the heroes’ eyes, more specifically Spider-Man's.

The Twin Towers of the World Trade Center have also been depicted in several online web comics:
 Coming-of-age web comic "Maddie in America" vols. 2 and 3 are set at the original World Trade Center during November 1985, with the main characters staying at the Vista Hotel and visiting the Austin J. Tobin Plaza and the Windows on the World restaurant.
 After Volume 5 of the spin-off series "Outsiders", the Twin Towers become a focal location of the series as the workplace of main character Siobhan Pattinson. She receives employment on the 103rd floor of the South Tower in the summer of 1987.
 Artist Sebastian Utzni's "M-Maybe" collects pages from 18 Comics published between 1973 and 2001 depicting the destruction of the Twin Towers.

Films

Television

Cartoons and anime
 In the 1985 cartoon M.A.S.K., an episode titled "Attack on Liberty" leads Matt Trakker to Miles Mayhem's current hideout – three quarters of the way up the side of the North Tower. Hovering the Thunderhawk outside the window, Matt leaps through the window and confronts Miles, who later escapes and is pursued by Matt around the Statue of Liberty. Mayhem's plot circulated around destroying the Statue and creating a 9/11-style incident.
 In the 1986 animated series The Real Ghostbusters, in the episode "The Bogeyman is Back" the Twin Towers are the site of a battle between the Ghostbusters and a blue ghost. During the battle, Egon Spengler is caught in the ghost's crosshairs and hangs from one of the towers. He falls, but is saved by Winston Zeddemore in a flying chopper and brought back to the roof as the other Ghostbusters Ray Stantz and Peter Venkman capture the ghosts.
 The Twin Towers were depicted as being part of the skyline of New York City in multiple episodes of the 1987 version of the Teenage Mutant Ninja Turtles cartoon television series:
 During the season three finale ("The Big Blow Out"), as the Technodrome rampages through New York, Krang uses the World Trade Center Towers as the basis of a conduit that will transmit enough energy to propel the earth into Dimension X, where Krang's spacefleet is waiting to destroy New York City.
 The season two episode "Enter: The Fly", the TMNT are flying in their blimp over New York City, searching for Shredder. April O'Neil said that Shredder was seen on the roof on one of the two buildings, and the TMNT find Shredder and Baxter Stockman there.
 In the 2000 MTV animated series Spy Groove, in the episode entitled "Manhattan Glam Chowder", the villain Mr. Fish is on top of the South Tower about to lure Agent #2 into a trap. Later Agent #1 appears on the North Tower and uses a laser to slice the antenna to make a bridge over to the South Tower. This episode did not air in the United States because the show was cancelled after six episodes. The episode can be found in Europe and Canada.
 In the 1994 cartoon Fantastic Four an episode titled "Incursion of the Skrull" featured New York City with the Twin Towers getting destroyed and crumbled by the laser blasters by one of the Alien Skrulls jet planes during the invasion of New York, where people are panicking. It later turned out to be a handheld video game played by a superhero named "The Thing." This episode was released seven years before 9/11.
 In Futurama, there is a future WTC in New York with its appearance very similar to the old one, except for its skybridges. In the art for the Volume 1 DVD collection, they are shown as similar to the Petronas Towers.
 In the 1994 animated series Gargoyles the Twin Towers are seen in a few episodes (such as the five-part pilot) as well as the third season opening of The Goliath Chronicles. The second-season episode "The Mirror" has an antagonist gargoyle, Demona, use a magical mirror with help from Puck atop the South Tower at night in order to amplify and broadcast an evil magic spell to all of New York City's human population. Ironically, this episode first aired on September 11, 1995.
 In the 1995 cartoon Fantomcat, an episode titled "The Manhattan Incident" has a mad scientist, Dr. Butyrik, attempt to launch a Protogen 6 powered rocket bomb from the top of the North Tower into space in order for him to destroy Manhattan. Fantomcat also fights Butyrik on top of the North Tower.
 In the 1998 animated series Godzilla: The Series The Twin Towers are seen in the intro of the series, and in a few episodes mostly on the Season 2 episode “Future Shock”, where the Twin Towers are seen lying the Hudson River destroyed in 2022, and character Randy Hernandez quotes "who was playing dominoes with the World Trade Center?".
 In the animated series Hey Arnold!, the Twin Towers are seen (alongside several other New York landmarks) during the character Helga's dream sequence in the fifth-season episode "Married" (which aired several months after the attacks). The show however is set mainly in the fictional city of Hillwood which is set in the Pacific Northwest (Brooklyn is one of the inspirations for the fictional city; the city, however, is mostly inspired by Seattle).
 In the 1994 cartoon Iron Man an episode titled "The Grim Reaper Wears a Teflon Coat" shows a simulated video by Tony Stark of what would happen if the "Grim Reaper" fighter jet fell in the wrong hands. It shows New York under attack by exploding missiles which hit both of the World Trade Center Towers. Later Mandarin discusses to MODOK his evil plan to crash the "Grim Reaper" into The Pentagon. This episode aired seven years before 9/11.
 In the animated sitcom The Simpsons: 
 In the season 9 episode titled "The City of New York vs. Homer Simpson" (1997), Homer is forced to deal with a mountain of parking tickets issued while his car sat illegally for months in the Austin J. Tobin plaza of the World Trade Center (an unrealistic event after the 1993 bombing, due to a bomb being placed inside a rental truck and parked in the garage in the basement). Homer, desperately needing to use the restroom, pushes people out of his way to get a ticket to the elevator into the towers. After pushing other people out of the elevator line to get to the top of the South Tower, Homer discovers the only working bathroom is in the North Tower. Also in the episode, two men in opposite towers begin arguing with each other, and one proclaims "Sorry, they put all the jerks in Tower One", a line which the show's creators expressed deep regret about during the post-9/11 episode commentary on the Season 9 box set. This episode has been banned in many countries (including some American affiliates around the time of the 9/11 attacks, though others have aired the episode with many edits to remove the scenes and verbal references to the World Trade Center), but is included in the season 9 box set. Some Fox affiliates continue to show the episode in syndication, including New York City's own WNYW Fox 5, airing the unaltered episode less than two weeks after the towers collapsed.
In "Desperately Xeeking Xena", the towers appear during the scene where Lisa uses her super strength to destroy a Nazi blimp with the Statue of Liberty.
 In the episode "New Kids on the Blecch", the towers can be seen as L.T. Smash steers a battleship into New York Harbor intending to blow up MAD Magazine. This episode was also taken off the air due to a scene where missiles are seen crashing into the MAD Magazine tower causing the building to collapse, providing a character to ask if everyone is okay; another replies "Yeah I feel great...didn't even hurt a bit."
 In the 1994 cartoon The Tick an episode titled "The Tick vs. The Proto-Clown" featured twin towers similar to the actual towers getting destroyed and demolished by an evil mutated clown.
 In an episode of the 1999 cartoon Mike, Lu, and Og Mike makes a sand sculpture of Manhattan, and she mentions the Twin Towers when showing it to Lu.
 In the 1999 animated series, Downtown, the towers are seen in the background of a couple of episodes.
 In the Digimon Adventure 02 episode "Digimon World Tour, Pt. 1", the Twin Towers can be seen in a skyline shot when Davis and Kari arrive in New York to round up some rogue Digimon.
 In the first episode of the 2001 fantasy anime OVA Read or Die, an aerial battle in Lower Manhattan (which climaxes around the Statue of Liberty) begins with a helicopter crash on the roof of one of the towers.
 The Twin Towers were depicted in the pilot episode of the animated TV show The Critic.
 In The Penguins of Madagascar episode, "Operation: Big Blue Marble", the skyline of New York is seen, showing the new One World Trade Center and Battery Park.
 A season two episode of The Transformers involves an invasion of New York by the Decepticons. In "City of Steel," Megatron's Constructicons steal buildings such as the Empire State Building and replace them with Cybertronian buildings and towers. Although the World Trade Center buildings aren't affected, they appear in establishing shots at the beginning of the episode, as well as panning shots at the end of the episode that demonstrate the city's restoration once the Decepticons are defeated.
 In the animated sitcom Family Guy:
 In the episode titled "A Picture is Worth 1,000 Bucks", Peter does a musical number with Meg across NYC, which had the Twin Towers. During the musical, Peter jumps off one of the towers and goes into match cut, singing with T Series.
 In the 2002 episode "Brian Wallows and Peter's Swallows", Brian performs a musical number to Pearl about how America has changed since the 1950s. Many cut scenes show places around the United States, including a shot of the Twin Towers. When the episode aired in 2002 on Fox, the two towers were digitally altered to look like generic buildings. Other airings of this episode (including the DVD release of Family Guys third season) have shown the Twin Towers intact.
 In the episode "Baby Not on Board", Peter and the family visit Ground Zero.
 In the episode "Hannah Banana", the September 11 attacks are seen as an Islamic man crashing a bicycle into one of the Twin Towers.
 In the episode "Back to the Pilot", Brian informs his past self from 1999 of the attacks on the WTC, allowing his past self to prevent them and consequently prevent George W. Bush from winning the 2004 U.S. presidential election. The latter then reformed the confederacy while based in Texas. As a result, eight southern states joined and initiated a Second American Civil War.
 In the episode "Peter & Lois' Wedding", the Twin Towers are seen several times on a flashback.

Live action television
 In the TV series Miami Vice (1984–1989), the Twin Towers are seen in the background of the pilot episode "Brother's Keeper" in Ricardo Tubbs' flashback. In the first episode of Season 2 "The Prodigal Son", the Twin Towers can be seen during the New York montage, and the shootout at the end of the episode was shot at the World Trade Center around The Sphere, Crockett then chases a drug dealer down and shoots down a helicopter with the Twin Towers seen in the background. 
 In the TV sitcom Barney Miller  (1975–1982), the Twin Towers were depicted in its intro before the opening credits from season 2 until the end of the series.
The exterior and interior of the Twin Towers were featured prominently, along with other New York City landmarks, in Late Night with David Letterman’s opening montage from 1987 to 1992.
 The TV series Third Watch (1999–2005), set in New York City, featured many shots of the Towers during the show's first two seasons. One final shot appeared in the episode September 10, set the day before the attacks.
 The first two seasons of Law & Order: Special Victims Unit included a shot of the towers at the beginning and end of the opening sequence. It was removed for episodes that aired after the attacks.
 The pilot of the TV series The Lone Gunmen, first aired on March 4, 2001, had the gunmen thwarting a plot to fly a jet into the World Trade Center. In the episode, a faction of the U.S. government is behind the plot; they hope to blame the attack on another country's dictator and use it as an excuse to start a war with him.
 In the first and second intro of Power Rangers: Time Force (2001), the Time Shadow was seen standing on the Twin Towers, just before the title of the show appears. After the events of 9/11, Fox Kids chose to remove the towers from the intro.
 The third season of NBC's The West Wing was postponed; instead, a special episode called "Isaac and Ishmael" was run. The episode started with the main characters paying tribute to the victims of 9/11 and dealt mainly with terrorism.
 In Star Trek: Enterprise (2001–2005), an image of the Twin Towers burning was visible in a panorama of historical images present in the timestream, when Daniels informed Jonathan Archer that time had been altered and set back on course. The episode is a two-parter called "Storm Front."
 The 2005–06 Portuguese soap opera Tempo de Viver devoted its entire first episode to a diamond heist in a South Tower corporate office. A subsequent confrontation as the would-be thief is caught is violently interrupted by Flight 11 crashing into the North Tower. The characters involved then scramble to leave the South Tower after it is also struck. Fictional footage of the attack as seen from the interior of the office was digitally created, but stock footage was also used for other scenes and later flashbacks.
 The 2003 HBO miniseries Angels in America (which takes place in the late 1980s) is noteworthy as being the first major post-9/11 production to digitally insert the towers in the New York City skyline.
 In a 2005 episode of Lost the Twin Towers are seen out of the window of a New York solicitor's office. They were digitally inserted to show the episode’s time frame.
 From 2007 to 2009, 7 World Trade Center's facade is used as the preface to scenes in ABC's Dirty Sexy Money for the office of Patrick "Tripp" Darling III.
 Shots of New York's skyline and well known locations, including some featuring the World Trade Center, were regularly used between scenes during Friends''' run (1994–2004). Those featuring the towers were retired after the attacks.
 On Fringe:
 During the final scene of the season one finale of Fringe, the World Trade Center is seen intact in a parallel universe of New York City. The main character, Olivia Dunham, is revealed to be in a South Tower office in an alternate reality of 2009 in which the World Trade Center was not destroyed on September 11, 2001. A newspaper headline reading "OBAMAS SET TO MOVE INTO NEW WHITE HOUSE" suggests that the White House was destroyed on September 11 in this alternate timeline instead of the Towers, and had just recently been rebuilt.
 The pan shot uses both real footage and CGI. As the shot pans out, it is visually clear that the Twin Towers are CGI, as the darker "bands" (the Skylobbies) are not visible. After sun flashes onto the screen, the Towers are less dark and have darker "bands."
 Following that episode, the show uses the Twin Towers as a frequent point of reference to indicate when a certain scene takes place in the parallel universe.
 2011 – Peter Bishop appears 15 years into the future in Season 3, standing outside of One World Trade Center.
 From 2008–present, Fringe depicts the rebuilt 7 World Trade Center as the headquarters of commercial conglomerate Massive Dynamic, and the Twin Towers as still standing as of 2011 (Season 4) in a parallel universe. Massive Dynamic was also headquartered in the World Trade Center's South Tower in the episode "Brown Betty".
 In a first-season episode of Journeyman, the Twin Towers are seen in a picture on the front page of a San Francisco newspaper when the main character goes back in time before the terrorist attacks.
 McCloud: in several episodes throughout the series, the World Trade Center can be seen in various stages of construction. The opening credits of Seasons 1 and 2 show both towers still under construction. During a scene on a ferry in the season three episode titled "A Little Plot At Tranquil Valley", a completed North Tower and a partially constructed South Tower can be seen in the background. The Towers also appeared in the opening credits of later seasons when McCloud was carried by a helicopter across Manhattan.
 The TV series Mediums seventh season episode "Where Were You When...?" features a quick shot of the burning towers.
 In the first season of Rescue Me (2004–2011), the main character of Tommy Gavin has several flashbacks to 9/11, both before and after the towers fall. 9/11 is mentioned through the entire season featuring four firefighters who were lost on that day. One of them appears in almost every episode as a vision to Tommy. Rescue Me was the first TV show to show a dramatized depiction of the events of 9/11.
 As construction of the World Trade Center progressed, it began appearing in later seasons of the Marlo Thomas series That Girl.
 In the pilot episode of the US version of Life on Mars, a shot of the Twin Towers with the upper floors still under construction is used to show that the main character has presumedly gone back in time to the year 1973.
 In the 2020 drama Quiz, the ITV crew were talking about whether to air the show or not. Meanwhile, they change to a news channel which is showing 9/11 in live pictures.
 In Season 7, Episode 5, A Trout in the Milk, of Agents of S.H.I.E.L.D. the Twin Towers are used as an establishing shot of 1973 New York, after the opening credits and title card. In reality, the telecommunications antenna shown on the North Tower wasn't added until 1978.
 Continuing into 2020, The Rachael Ray television show showed the World Trade Center in the backdrop to the studio kitchen.
 In the Netflix series The Crown, during the chapter in where Princess Diana visits New York in season 4, the Twin Towers appeared briefly in a cutscene.
 In the Netflix miniseries Archive 81, Dan Turner looks out a hospital window in 1994 and the Twin Towers are seen in the windows reflection.
 Mark I Video C&O 614 Return of a Thoroughbred from October 1996 features the two world trade center towers in the background with C&O 614 in the foreground in one brief shot for a few seconds as the engine was in Hoboken at the time.

Televised advertisements

 An Anheuser-Busch advertisement for Budweiser beer features the company's signature Clydesdale horses appearing to pay their respects to the tower-less New York skyline. It was aired during Fox Sports's TV broadcast of Super Bowl XXXVI in 2002, as well as on the tenth anniversary of the attacks, during that day's National Football League (NFL) games.
 The Twin Towers had appeared on the cityscape graphic that appeared on cans of Chock full o'Nuts coffee. The graphic was later revamped with the towers removed after 9/11.
 In Eurosport's Olympic Magazine commercial, a few seconds of the beginning of the North Tower collapse are shown.

Music

 The music video for Lil' Kim's 1996 No Time single was shot within the World Trade Center premises.
 The Italian singer Eros Ramazotti made a video for his song "Cose Della Vita" (1993). Throughout the video, it's possible seeing from afar the towers and part of Lower Manhattan.
 The cover of the US version of the album Stars on Long Play III features a woman wearing 3-D glasses in front of the towers with three stars.
 The cover of the album Breakfast in America by Supertramp features the New York City skyline and the Twin Towers, portrayed as common kitchen items, from the view of an airplane window.
 The towers feature at the beginning of the Spice Girls music video "2 Become 1" from 1996, with the group appearing in various locations around the city.
 The towers were featured in Limp Bizkit's music video "Rollin'" from 2000 starring the band members performing on top of the South Tower.
 A French promotional video for Depeche Mode's song "Enjoy the Silence" was filmed at the World Trade Center. The video features the members on top of the South Tower lip-syncing to the song, with views of the North Tower in the background.
 The towers are featured in the opening shot of Spice Girls music video for the song "2 Become 1" in 1996, as a daytime to nighttime lapse.
 The towers are featured in the opening shot of Blondie's music video for the song "Heart of Glass".
 The towers are featured in the opening shot of Bananarama's music video for the song "Cruel Summer".
 The towers are featured in the opening shot of Tina Turner's music video for the song "What's Love Got to Do with It".
 The towers are featured in the opening shot of Madonna's music video for the song "Like a Virgin".
 The towers were featured in the closing shot of Demi Lovato's lyric video for the song "I Love Me".
 The towers are featured in the Guns N' Roses song "Paradise City" when band member Duff McKagan is seen taking a boat ride on the East River.
 Bruce Springsteen mentioned the World Trade Center in his song "Darlington County" on his album "Born In The USA."
 Junko Ohashi's Magical album in 1984 features the World Trade Center towers.
 The video for Ryan Adams's song "New York, New York" featured Adams performing in front of the Manhattan skyline, including the towers, and was filmed on September 7, 2001, four days before the attack.

Video games
 The laser disc arcade game Cobra Command (1984) features the Twin Towers prominently in the New York City level. It is possible for the player to crash a helicopter into one of the towers.
 The 1988 arcade game Vigilante features a panoramic shot of New York City on the title screen, including the World Trade Center. This same title screen was included in the TurboGrafx-16 version. In the background during gameplay is the New York skyline, including the World Trade Center's Twin Towers.
 Manhunter: New York (1988) features establishing shots of the city, including the Twin Towers, still standing in an alternate future where the world is taken over by the Orbs.
 Ninja Gaiden (arcade game) (1988)-The second stage shows Ryu Hayabusa beating down some gangs in New York City as the World Trade Center is shown in the background when he's about to face the two bosses.
 The 1990 arcade game The Combatribes features the World Trade Center on the title screen as the game's action takes place across New York. The 1992 Super NES version of the game shows the characters heading back towards the Twin Towers in the ending cutscene.
 Streets of Rage, a game released in 1991 on the Sega Genesis, features the Twin Towers in the background of the final boss battle at the end credits, which occurs in one of the buildings surrounding the towers.
 Two Crude (1991) was a beat 'em up set in NYC in the year '2010 AD'. The Twin Towers are depicted in the intro about a post-apocalyptic New York in control by a criminal gang with biohazard weapons; plus they are also a focal point in the start screen.
 Streets of Rage 2 (1992), sequel to Streets of Rage, features the World Trade Center in  the game's opening scene.
 King of the Monsters 2 (1992) for the Neo-Geo has the Twin Towers in the first level, and the game provides a bonus for destroying them.
 Cadillacs and Dinosaurs (arcade game) (1993) The game begins with a panoramic view of New York in the year 2513 where you can see the World Trade Center in the background.
 The 1993 arcade game Zero Team features the World Trade Center at the end of the first level.
 In Aero Fighters 2 (1994) for the Neo-Geo, the first half of the U.S. level takes place in New York City, featuring the World Trade Center in the background. The player is able to destroy the buildings, along with all the others in New York City.
 The 1994 action game Urban Strike, the third in the Strike series, features a scene where a giant laser deflects from a satellite, hitting the Twin Towers. Further missions take place involving the effects of this laser at the World Trade Center. Ironically, the game takes place in a fictional/alternate 2001 timeline.
 Tekken 2 (1995) for the arcade and the PlayStation features the World Trade Center in Paul Phoenix's stage.
 Parasite Eve (1998), set within Manhattan and making direct remarks to areas such as Central Park, features 1 and 2 World Trade Center in its opening FMV shot, as the camera slowly pulls out of a close-up of the Statue of Liberty.
 In the 1998 Nintendo 64 game Rush 2: Extreme Racing USA, the entire World Trade Center complex is featured on the 'New York: Downtown' track. Buildings 1–6, and the western pedestrian bridge are all accessible to drive around. The stairways on both sides of the complex double as jumps for the racers.
 The 1999 PC game Sim City 3000 features the North and South Towers as buildable landmarks. Both towers appear to be the South Tower, however, as both have the South Tower's observation deck, and the ‘North Tower’ lacks the antenna.
 In Hybrid Heaven (1999), for the Nintendo 64, in the main title screen, it shows the World Trade Center in New York City at night time.
 Driver (1999) features 1 and 2 World Trade Center, as well as The Sphere, in its depiction of New York – the final city unlocked. On "Take a Ride" mode, the player starts on a road just south of (and facing) the South Tower. On original issues of the game, the box art showed the Twin Towers. In later issues of the game released after 9/11, the Twin Towers were removed from the box art.
 The 1999 racing video game Test Drive 6 features the Twin Towers in one of its race courses, which is based on New York City. The buildings appear as part of the course's scenery, as well as its loading screen.
 The Twin Towers appear briefly in the first level of the arcade video game 18 Wheeler: American Pro Trucker (2000). The PlayStation 2 version, released after September 11, 2001, has the towers omitted.
 The first level of the 2000 video game Deus Ex (set in 2052) encompasses Liberty Island and a bombed Statue of Liberty. The section of the New York City skyline containing the Twin Towers is absent, to reduce memory requirements for the map. The reason that the developers gave, if anyone asked, was that they had been destroyed by terrorists: "We just said that the Towers had been destroyed too, and this was way before 9/11… years. That's kind of freaky." Midnight Club: Street Racing (2000) features the entire WTC complex, where players can drive into the Austin Tobin Plaza in between the Twin Towers. They can also gain access to the underground parking garage beneath the World Trade Center (the site of the February 26, 1993 bombing).
 Shortly after the attacks, the now defunct Westwood Studios pulled all remaining copies of the 2000 real-time strategy game Command & Conquer: Red Alert 2, whose box contained artwork of New York City under attack by invading Soviet forces; notable landmarks depicted under attack included the World Trade Center and the Statue of Liberty. The single player campaign of the game also contained a pair of missions in which the player was instructed to destroy The Pentagon and capture the World Trade Center, as well as being able to destroy it. Westwood retooled the box art before re-releasing the game.
 Propeller Arena (2001) was a cancelled Dreamcast aerial dogfight game, since leaked on the internet, that features a Twin Towers-style building.
 Max Payne (2001) features the World Trade Center in several billboards for the fictional company "Aesir" and during the graphic novel cutscenes. They are also visible in the background in the beginning of the mission "The American Dream". The buildings were visible in the PC version of the game, however they were removed from the game's PlayStation 2 and Xbox ports, which were released in December 2001. The Game Boy Advance, Android, and iOS versions re-inserted the towers.
 In Trade Center Defender (2001), a flash-arcade game released on September 12, 2001, players had to shoot down planes that were heading towards the towers. If an aircraft managed to get through the buildings, the towers would pulverize. On September 13, the game was removed from sale over the internet. Lycos apologized for the game and pulled it from Angelfire arcade. By late September, the game was remade by French website Uzinagaz and was titled New York Defender. Unlike in the original game, the burning towers in the remake were made to look more realistic and similar to how they were destroyed during the actual disaster. New York Defender can still be found today in arcade and flash gaming websites.
 Metal Gear Solid 2: Sons of Liberty (2001) featured a major plot on a ship going down the Hudson River, with the World Trade Center included. The building was cut from the game, delaying both games' releases.
 Spider-Man 2: Enter Electro (2001), featured the roofs of both towers in the final stage. The level involved battling Hyper-Electro and the antenna atop the North Tower was crucial in defeating the villain. The game was originally released in North America on August 26, 2001, though the game was pulled after the attacks and re-released on October 17, 2001, with a modified final stage so that the buildings less resembled the Twin Towers.  The PAL version of the game was never released prior to the attacks.
 In response to the events of September 11, Microsoft announced that future versions of Microsoft Flight Simulator would not include the Twin Towers in the game's New York City skyline. A patch was also made available to remove the World Trade Center from the existing versions of the simulator.
 In Grand Theft Auto III (2001), it is believed the World Trade Center was to make an appearance. Due to the city (Liberty City) being based on New York and the game being intended to be released in the autumn of 2001, the game at one time may have contained the World Trade Center. It was reported that the World Trade Center was entirely deleted, flight paths in game for the scripted plane AI were altered to fly farther away from the downtown area, and a mission arc and character involving terrorism was removed. Users on a GTA forum online were able to conclude that the World Trade Center was once occupying the "Love Media Building" site, but that it was replaced with a new unrelated tower.
 The 2002 video game Spider-Man, the first game adaptation of the film, the cutscenes features the World Trade Center towers outside of Norman Osborn's office where Spider-Man enters.
 The 2004 video game Spider-Man 2, the second game adaptation of the film, features a virtual Manhattan which included a large plaza, bearing resemblance to the Tribute in Light memorial, on the World Trade Center site.
 The 2005 video game True Crime: New York City features a fenced-off "Ground Zero".
 In Tycoon City: New York (2006), the World Trade Center is paid tribute to in the form of two very tall trees standing side by side, representing the Towers. Further into the park, there is a Pentagon-shaped base, with the American flag at half mast. An inscription on the side reads We Will Never Forget.
 Driver: Parallel Lines (2006) features a slightly modified World Trade Center complex in the game's depiction of 1978 New York City, lacking the Marriott World Trade Center hotel and 7 World Trade Center (since both were completed in the 1980s). The complex also features The Sphere sculpture, though unlike the real World Trade Center, a road divides the complex in two. In the game's latter half, set in 2006, the entire area is replaced by a fenced-off building site.
 In World in Conflict'' (2007), the game's teaser trailer prominently features the skyline of New York City during a U.S. Ranger assault on Governor's Island, which has been occupied by the Soviets in an alternate timeline in which the Cold War culminates into World War III between the U.S. and the Soviet Union. The game is set in an alternate 1989, 12 years before 9/11. In the tenth level, "Liberty Lost", the World Trade Center is featured prominently in the background during the player's efforts to recapture Governor's, Ellis, and Liberty Islands.

See also
 7 World Trade Center

References

Further reading

External links
 Celluloid Skyline, James Sanders
 World Trade Center – Literary and Cultural Reflections, Dennis G. Jerz, Seton Hill University
 WTC in Movies The Web's most extensive list

Popular culture
New York City in popular culture
Stock market in popular culture